The 1975 Torneo Godó or Trofeo Conde de Godó was a combined men's and women's tennis tournament that took place on outdoor clay courts at the Real Club de Tenis Barcelona in Barcelona, Spain. It was the 23rd edition of the tournament and the men's events were part of the 1975 Grand Prix circuit. It was held from 13 October until 19 October 1975. Fourth-seeded Björn Borg won the singles title.

Finals

Men's singles
 Björn Borg defeated  Adriano Panatta 1–6, 7–6, 6–3, 6–2
 It was Borg's 5th singles title of the year and the 13th of his career.

Women's singles
 Janice Metcalf defeated  Iris Riedel 4–6, 6–1, 6–4

Men's doubles
 Björn Borg /  Guillermo Vilas defeated  Wojciech Fibak /  Karl Meiler 3–6, 6–4, 6–3

References

External links
 ITF tournament edition details
 ATP tournament profile
 Official tournament website

Barcelona Open (tennis)
Torneo Godo
Torneo Godo
Torneo Godo